Jane A. McKeating is a professor of molecular biology at Oxford University, and honorary professor at the University of Birmingham, England, where she worked as a professor of molecular virology until 2017. She is listed as a notable scientist in Thomson Reuters' Highly Cited Researchers 2014, ranking her among the top 1% most cited scientists.

Education
McKeating obtained a Bachelor of Science degree (BSc, Hons) in 1982 and a Doctorate in 1987.

Career

McKeating was a fellow of the Lister Institute of Preventive Medicine from 1994 to 1999.

In 2005, McKeating became professor of molecular virology and deputy head of the School of Immunity and Infection at the University of Birmingham, where she established the school's HCV group which is involved in various national and international collaborative studies.

In 2017, she was appointed as professor of molecular biology at Oxford University, and continues as an honorary professor of the University of Birmingham. In 2019 she became an official fellow of Parks College.

McKeating is a member of the scientific advisory boards for the University of Essen, Astex Pharmaceuticals, and Arrow Pharmaceuticals.

Research areas
McKeating's research focuses on the molecular biology of hepatitis B (HBV) and hepatitis C (HCV), particularly the role of cell surface receptors in the viral life cycle.

Selected publications

2012 – In silico directed mutagenesis identifies the CD81/claudin-1 hepatitis C virus receptor interface. Davis C, Harris HJ, Hu K, Drummer HE, McKeating JA, Mullins JG, Balfe P. Cellular microbiology 14: 1892–903 Link
2012 – Hepatitis C virus and the brain. Fletcher NF, McKeating JA. Journal of viral hepatitis 19: 301–6 Link
2012 – Over the fence or through the gate: how viruses infect polarised cells. Fletcher NF, Howard C, McKeating JA. Immunotherapy 4: 249–51 Link
2012 – Hepatitis C virus entry: beyond receptors. Meredith LW, Wilson GK, Fletcher NF, McKeating JA. Reviews in medical virology 2012 22: 182–93 Link
2013 – Paracrine signals from liver sinusoidal endothelium regulate hepatitis C virus replication. Rowe IA, Galsinh SK, Wilson GK, Parker R, Durant S, Lazar C, Branza-Nichita N, Bicknell R, Adams DH, Balfe P, McKeating JA. Hepatology Link
2013 – An alpaca nanobody inhibits hepatitis C virus entry and cell-to-cell transmission. Tarr AW, Lafaye P, Meredith L, Damier-Piolle L, Urbanowicz RA, Meola A, Jestin JL, Brown RJ, McKeating JA, Rey FA, Ball JK, Krey T. Hepatology Link
2013 – HRas signal transduction promotes hepatitis C virus cell entry by triggering assembly of the host tetraspanin receptor complex. Zona L, Lupberger J, Sidahmed-Adrar N, Thumann C, Harris HJ, Barnes A, Florentin J, Tawar RG, Xiao F, Turek M, Durand SC, Duong FH, Heim MH, Cosset FL, Hirsch I, Samuel D, Brino L, Zeisel MB, Le Naour F, McKeating JA, Baumert TF. Cell host & microbe 13: 302–13 Link
2013 – A bile acid transporter as a candidate receptor for hepatitis B and D virus entry. Xiao F, McKeating JA, Baumert TF. Journal of Hepatology 58: 1246–8 Link
2013 – Early infection events highlight the limited transmissibility of hepatitis C virus in vitro. Meredith LW, Harris HJ, Wilson GK, Fletcher NF, Balfe P, McKeating JA. Journal of Hepatology 58: 1074–80 Link
2013 – Hepatoma polarisation limits CD81 and hepatitis C virus dynamics. Harris HJ, Clerte C, Farquhar MJ, Goodall M, Hu K, Rassam P, Dosset P, Wilson GK, Balfe P, Ijzendoorn SC, Milhiet PE, McKeating JA. Cellular microbiology 15: 430–45 Link
2013 – Heterogeneous claudin-1 expression in human liver. Harris HJ, Wilson GK, Hübscher SG, McKeating JA. Hepatology 57: 854–5 Link
2014 – Hypoxia inducible factors in liver disease and hepatocellular carcinoma: current understanding and future directions. Wilson GK, Tennant DA, McKeating JA. Journal of Hepatology 61:1397-406. Link

Awards and honours
McKeating has won multiple professional awards and fellowships, including:
1988 Herpes Vaccine Research Trust Prize (Society for General Microbiology)
1990 Senior AIDS Research Fellowship (Medical Research Council)
1994 Research Fellowship (Lister Institute of Preventive Medicine)
1995 Fleming Award (Society for General Microbiology)
2006 Wolfson Merit Award (Royal Society) 
2010 Distinguished Virology Lecture (University of Oxford)
2015 Hans Fischer Senior Fellowship (Technische Universität München)

References

External links
 University of Birmingham profile
 Interview with The Naked Scientists
 

Living people
British virologists
Women virologists
Academics of the University of Birmingham
20th-century British scientists
21st-century British scientists
20th-century British women scientists
21st-century British women scientists
20th-century biologists
21st-century biologists
Year of birth missing (living people)
Alumni of the University of Reading
Fellows of Reuben College, Oxford